Yuzhin is a Russian masculine surname, its feminine counterpart is Yuzhina. It may refer to
Alexander Yuzhin (1857–1927), stage name of Georgian Prince and Moscow theatre actor Sumbatov
Boris Yuzhin (born 1942), Soviet spy
Natalia Ermolenko-Yuzhina (1881–1937), Russian opera singer

Russian-language surnames